Chawpi Urqu (Quechua chawpi middle, center, urqu mountain, "middle mountain", Hispanicized spelling Chaupi Orjo) is a mountain in the Andes of Peru, about  high. It is situated in the Ayacucho Region, Cangallo Province, Totos District, northeast of Totos. Chawpi Urqu lies north of Huch'uy Puka Q'asa. The lake east of it is named Llulluchaqucha (Llullucha Ccocha).

References

Mountains of Peru
Mountains of Ayacucho Region